The 2018 London 9s was the first staging of the London 9s tournament and took place at East London RFC on the 21 July, 2018 with the Wan Papua Warriors taking the men's title and Castleford Tigers taking the women's tournament.

Teams

Mens Open
Australian All Stars 
Hammersmith Hills Hoists 
London Chargers 
London Spartans 
Red Star Belgrade RLFC 
Wan Papua Warriors 
Wests Warriors

Mens Social
Bath Rugby League 
Boston Buccaneers 
Brixton Bulls 
Cardiff Blue Dragons 
Elmbridge Eagles 
London Skolars Under 20s 
MoBro 
Newham Dockers 
Richmond Rugby League

Women's tournament
Castleford Tigers Women 
Ironsides 
MoSistas
Royal Navy

References

2018 in English rugby league
International rugby league competitions hosted by the United Kingdom
Rugby league nines